Francesco Renaldi (1755–1798 or later) was an English-born painter of Italian parentage.

Renaldi entered the Royal Academy Schools in London in October 1776, aged twenty-one. For two years after 1781, Renaldi traveled in Italy, initially with the Welsh landscape painter Thomas Jones.  Renaldi was active as a painter in India from 1786 to 1796. Works painted by Renaldi in India include Muslim Lady Reclining (1789), inscribed as being painted at "Dacca" (ie Dhaka) (now in the Yale Center for British Art), and a portrait of the British East India Company's Paymaster General Charles Cockerell and his Wife, Maria Tryphena, and her Sister, Charlotte Blunt (1789) (sold at Christie's, London, 17 March 1978, lot 62).

After his return from India, Renaldi exhibited a conversation piece group portrait of Thomas Jones and his family at the Royal Academy in 1798 (now in the collection of Amgueddfa Cymru - National Museum Wales).

Additional bibliography

Mildred Archer, India and British Portraiture, 1770-1825 (London and New York, 1979) (pp 280–297)

William Foster, 'British artists in India, 1760-1820' The Volume of the Walpole Society 19 (1930-1931) 1 (p 65)

References 

1755 births
1798 deaths
18th-century Italian painters
Italian expatriates in India
18th-century English painters
English people of Italian descent
Alumni of the Royal Academy Schools